Abdoulaye Djimdé is an associate professor of Microbiology and Immunology in Mali. He works on the genetic epidemiology of antimalarial drug resistance and is a Wellcome Sanger Institute International Fellow. He is Chief of the Molecular Epidemiology and Drug Resistance Unit at the University of Bamako Malaria Research and Training Centre.

Early life and education 
Djimdé earned a doctorate in pharmacy in 1988 at the University of Bamako. He opened his own pharmacy and realised that people needed more effective methods to treat malaria. He began to volunteer with Ogobara Doumbo at the new Malaria Research and Training Centre, and moved to the University of Maryland, Baltimore County to complete a PhD. He worked with the National Institutes of Health and identified the first molecular marker of chloroquine resistant malaria. During his PhD he joined the American Society of Tropical Medicine and Hygiene.

Research and career 

In 2005 Djimdé was awarded a Howard Hughes Medical Institute Fellowship. He is a Wellcome Sanger Institute Fellow. He works at the University of Bamako, where he and his research group are trying to identify how variation of the genome of plasmodium falciparum and anopheles gambiae help malaria to spread. He is involved with several collaborations across the Medical Research Council Centre for Genomics and Global Health, including MalariaGEN and the Plasmodium Diversity Network Africa (PDNA). The PDNA has connected 11 countries in Sub-Saharan Africa, helping African scientists collaborate and influence global health policy.

Djimdé helped to establish the Worldwide Antimalarial Resistance Network and served on the advisory board. In 2012 he was appointed associate professor of Parasitology and Microbiology and the University of Bamako. He is Director of Developing Excellence in Leadership and Genetics Training for Malaria Elimination in sub-Saharan Africa (DELGEME). DELGEME trains graduates, postdocs and fellows in bioinformatics and genomics of malaria. He coordinates clinical trials for antimalarials in Western Africa. He led the trail of pyramax, which he showed could be used to treat multiple episodes of malaria.

He appeared on the Elsevier radio show Malaria Nexus.

Awards and honours 
2001 l’Ordre National du Mali

2002 Federation of the European Societies for Tropical Medicine and International Health Fighting Malaria Prize

2005 Howard Hughes Medical Institute International Scholar

2009 National Academy of Pharmacy of France Prix de la Pharmacie Francophone

2018 Member of the Academy of Sciences of Mali

References 

Living people
Malian scientists
Academic staff of the University of Bamako
University of Maryland, Baltimore County alumni
Howard Hughes Medical Investigators
Year of birth missing (living people)
21st-century Malian people
Fellows of the African Academy of Sciences